Joseph A. Schmitz was a member of the Wisconsin State Assembly.

Biography
Schmitz was born on July 5, 1898 in Milwaukee, Wisconsin. He died on February 9, 1994.

Career
Schmitz was a member of the Assembly during the 1939, 1941 and 1943 sessions. Additionally, he was a justice of the peace. He was a Republican.

References

External links
The Political Graveyard
AncientFaces

Politicians from Milwaukee
Republican Party members of the Wisconsin State Assembly
American justices of the peace
Military personnel from Milwaukee
American military personnel of World War I
1898 births
1994 deaths
20th-century American judges
20th-century American politicians